Anochrostomus formosus is a species of seed bug in the family Lygaeidae. It is found in southern North America, Central America, and South America.

References

External links

 

Lygaeidae
Hemiptera of North America
Hemiptera of South America
Insects described in 1840